Rarities is a compilation album by Mexican band Kinky. It was released in July 2006 on Sonic360 Records.

Track listing
 "Coqueta" – 3:39
 "Oye Como Va (Extended Mix)" – 4:29
 "Selva Lombardi" – 2:19
 "Canibal" – 4:04
 "Presidente (Money Mark Remix)" – 3:41
 "Aquí Es la Vida" – 3:49
 "Soun Tha Primer Amor (Bostich Remix)" – 3:08
 "Five Rooms" – 1:47
 "Más (Toy Selectah Remix)" – 5:03
 "Soun Tha Primer Amor (Capri Remix)" – 7:44
 "Oye Como Va (Lazyboy Instrumental)" – 3:33
 "Más (Live)" – 4:04
 "The Headphonist (Live)" – 4:54
 "Sol (Live)" – 5:32

References

2007 compilation albums
Kinky (band) albums